The New Zealand national cricket team represents New Zealand in international cricket and is a full member of the International Cricket Council (ICC) with Test,   One Day International (ODI) and T20I status. They played their first Test in 1930 against England in Christchurch, New Zealand, becoming the fifth country to play Test cricket. It took the team 26 years until the 1955–56 season to win a Test match, when they defeated West Indies at Eden Park in Auckland. They played their first ODI in the 1972–73 season against Pakistan in Christchurch. They are the joint oldest nation with Australia to play first Twenty20 International in 2005.
 
New Zealand's win percentage in test cricket is 23.83. As of August 2021, New Zealand have played 449 Test matches; out of which they have won 107, lost 175, while 167 matches have ended as draw.

New Zealand is also one of the most successful ODI team, as they have reached many tournament's semi-finals. As of August 2021, they have played 775 ODI matches, out of which they have won 354, lost 374; 7 matches have ended as a tie, whilst 40 had no result. They have reached six semi-finals at Cricket World Cup which is more than any other, in 1975, 1979, 1992, 1999, 2007, and 2011. New Zealand's best performance in world cups came in 2015 and 2019 when they ended as runners-up. In ICC Champions Trophy, New Zealand became champions in 2000. They were also the runners up in ICC Champions Trophy 2009 and semi-finalists in ICC Champions Trophy 2006 as well.

New Zealand has shown average performances in Twenty20 Internationals. As of October 2021, New Zealand have played 150 T20I matches and won 73 of them, lost 65, 8 matches ended as a tie whilst 4 matches yielded no result. Their win  percentage is  52.73. During 6 ICC World Twenty20 tournaments, New Zealand's best performance came during 2007 and 2016 where they finished as semi-finalists.

As of August 2021, New Zealand has faced nine teams in Test cricket, with their most frequent opponent is England; playing 107 matches against them. However, they have registered most wins against Sri Lanka that is 16 wins, but their best win percentage is 80% against Bangladesh, against whom they have won 12 out of 15 tests. In ODI matches, New Zealand have played against 18 teams; they have played against their continent rivals, Australia most frequently, with a winning percentage of 29.77 in 137 matches. Within usual major ODI nations, New Zealand have defeated Sri Lanka and India on 49 occasions, which is their best record in ODIs. The team has competed against 13 countries in T20IS.

Key

Test cricket

Matches played (by country)

One Day International

Matches played (by country)

Twenty20 International

Matches played (by country)

Notes

References

Cricket records and statistics
New Zealand in international cricket